Antoni Kazimierz Pacyński (born 29 May 1943) is a Polish equestrian. He competed in two events at the 1968 Summer Olympics.

References

External links
 Biography at olimpijski.pl

1943 births
Living people
Polish male equestrians
Olympic equestrians of Poland
Equestrians at the 1968 Summer Olympics
People from Jarosław
Sportspeople from Podkarpackie Voivodeship